Piece of Mind is the fourth studio album by English heavy metal band Iron Maiden. It was released on 16 May 1983 in the United Kingdom by EMI Records and in the United States by Capitol Records. It was the first album to feature drummer Nicko McBrain, who had recently left the band Trust and has been Iron Maiden's drummer ever since.

Piece of Mind was a mostly critical and commercial success, reaching number three on the UK Albums Chart and achieving platinum certification in the UK and North America.

Background
In December 1982, drummer Clive Burr ended his association with the band due to personal and tour schedule problems and was replaced by Nicko McBrain, previously of French band Trust, as well as Pat Travers and Streetwalkers. Soon afterwards, the band went to Jersey to compose the songs, taking over the hotel Le Chalet (as it was out of season) and rehearsing in its restaurant. In February, the band journeyed for the first time to the Bahamas to record the album at Nassau's Compass Point Studios. Recordings were finished in March, and the album was later mixed at Electric Lady Studios in New York City.

This is the first of four Iron Maiden albums that were not named after a song featured on the album itself (though the lyrics in the song "Still Life" contain the expression "peace of mind"). Originally, the release's working title was Food for Thought—once the band had decided that Eddie would be lobotomised on the front cover—until the band came up with the title Piece of Mind in a pub in Jersey during the album's writing stage.

Included in the liner notes is a slightly altered version of a passage from the Book of Revelation, which reads,

The actual text (from Chapter 21, Verse 4) is nearly identical, except that it reads, "neither shall there be any more pain" rather than "brain", which was added as a pun on the album's title.

In a lower corner on the back side of the album cover, there is this message: "No synthesizers or ulterior motives".

Composition
Lyrically, the album largely reflects the group's literary interests, such as "To Tame a Land", inspired by Frank Herbert's 1965 science fiction novel Dune;  "Sun and Steel", based on the life of samurai Miyamoto Musashi and its title taken from Yukio Mishima's 1968 essay; "Still Life", influenced by Ramsey Campbell's 1964 short story "The Inhabitant of the Lake", and "The Trooper", inspired by Alfred, Lord Tennyson's The Charge of the Light Brigade (1854). Film influences are also present, such as "Where Eagles Dare", based on the Brian G. Hutton 1968 film, scripted by Alistair MacLean, and "Quest for Fire", based on the 1981 film by Jean-Jacques Annaud. On top of this, "Revelations", written by Dickinson, includes lines from G. K. Chesterton's hymn O God of Earth and Altar, while the remainder of the song is influenced by Aleister Crowley. More exotic influences include Greek mythology, albeit slightly altered, for "Flight of Icarus". "To Tame a Land" was meant to be entitled "Dune" after the novel, but after seeking permission from Frank Herbert's agents, the band received a message which stated, "Frank Herbert doesn't like rock bands, particularly heavy rock bands, and especially bands like Iron Maiden" and were forced to change the name.

Hidden message 
At the beginning of the sixth track, "Still Life", the band included a hidden message which could only be understood by playing the song backwards. This was a joke and an intended swing back at the critics who had accused Iron Maiden of being Satanic. The backwards-message consists of drummer Nicko McBrain mimicking actor John Bird's impression of Idi Amin, uttering the following phrase "What ho said the t'ing with the three 'bonce', don't meddle with things you don't understand...", followed by a belch. The phrase itself is taken from the satirical album The Collected Broadcasts of Idi Amin (1975) by Bird and Alan Coren. "What ho" and "What ho said the t'ing" are phrases that also crop up regularly on McBrain's "Listen With Nicko!" tracks from The First Ten Years collection.

According to McBrain, "We were sick and tired of being labelled as Devil worshippers and all this bollocks by these fucking morons in the States, so we thought, 'Right, you want to take the piss? We'll show you how to take the bleeding piss, my son!' And one of the boys taped me in the middle of this Idi Amin routine I used to do when I'd had a few drinks. I remember it distinctly ended with the words, 'Don't meddle wid t'ings yo don't understand.' We thought, if people were going to be stupid about this sort of thing, we might as well give them something to be really stupid about, you know?"

Release and reception

Preceded by the single "Flight of Icarus" on 28 April, Piece of Mind was released on 16 May 1983. It peaked at No. 3 in the UK and spent eighteen weeks on the chart.

In North America, the album became the band's highest charting thus far, peaking at No.14 in the Billboard 200. By July, Piece of Mind was certified gold by the RIAA, rising up to platinum status in 1986. In 1995, the album achieved platinum status in the UK.

In 1983, Kerrang! published a poll of the greatest metal albums of all time, with Piece of Mind ranking No.1 and The Number of the Beast at No.2. Reviews were mostly positive, with Sputnikmusic hailing it "easily an album that belongs in your collection" (although they argue that "the likes of Powerslave [1984], Somewhere in Time [1986], and Brave New World [2000] would overtake it"). AllMusic described it as "essential for anyone with even the most basic interest in heavy metal", although "the second half dips a bit from the first". In a mixed review from Rolling Stone, "Both Piece of Mind and Powerslave proceed in kind, albeit with diminished melodic interest..."

It was ranked No. 21 on IGN's list of the top 25 metal albums in 2007.

The supporting tour titled the World Piece Tour opened at Hull City Hall on 2 May. The tour concluded on 18 December, and its 139 concerts included a televised performance at Westfalenhalle in Dortmund.

Cover versions
In 2010, Maiden uniteD, featuring lead singer Damian Wilson, released an all-acoustic reinterpretation of the album entitled Mind the Acoustic Pieces.

Two songs were covered for the 2008 tribute album Maiden Heaven: A Tribute to Iron Maiden: "The Trooper" by Coheed and Cambria and "To Tame a Land" by Dream Theater. The latter was also included in the special edition of Dream Theater's 2009 album Black Clouds & Silver Linings.

"The Trooper" has been covered by Finnish doom/death metal band Sentenced on their 1994 EP The Trooper, the American heavy metal band Iced Earth on the "tour edition" of their 2011 album, Dystopia, the death metal band Vital Remains on the 1998 tribute album A Call to Irons, Christian hard rock band Stryper on the album, The Covering, in 2011, and Swedish lounge act Hellsongs on their 2008 album, Hymns in the Key of 666.

"Where Eagles Dare" has been covered by Fozzy on their second album, Happenstance, in 2002. Fozzy have also covered "The Prisoner" (from The Number of the Beast) on their debut, Fozzy. The song was also covered by Faroese viking metal band Týr on their 2013 album Valkyrja, and Deliverance on their 2013 album Hear What I Say!.

Track listing

 Initial pressings of the album had "To Tame a Land" erroneously listed as "Dune", its original title.
 The first North American picture disc edition includes "Cross-Eyed Mary" as a bonus track on side one.
 The first Japanese CD pressing from 1986 has the hidden message preceding "Still Life" included as a separate track listed as "Phatoor".

Personnel
Production and performance credits are adapted from the album liner notes.

Iron Maiden
Bruce Dickinson – vocals
Dave Murray – guitars
Adrian Smith – guitars
Steve Harris – bass
Nicko McBrain – drums

Production
Martin "Black Night" Birch – producer, engineer, mixing
Frank Gibson – assistant engineer
Denis Haliburton – assistant engineer
Bruce Buchhalter – assistant mixing engineer
Derek Riggs – sleeve illustration, sleeve design, sleeve concept
Simon Fowler – photography
Keith Peacock – art continuation
Rod Smallwood – management, sleeve design, sleeve concept
Andy Taylor – management
George Marino at Sterling Sound  - Original US LP mastering 
Utopia Studios, London UK - Original UK LP mastering
Simon Heyworth – remastering (1998 edition)
Ross Halfin – photography (1998 edition)
Robert Ellis – photography (1998 edition)

Charts

Weekly charts

Year-end charts

Certifications

References

Bibliography

1983 albums
Iron Maiden albums
Albums produced by Martin Birch
EMI Records albums
Albums recorded at Electric Lady Studios
Music based on Dune (franchise)